Harry Fitzhugh Lee House is a historic home located at Goldsboro, Wayne County, North Carolina.  It was built in 1922, and is a two-story, five bay, Colonial Revival style brick dwelling with a gambrel roof and frame shed-roof dormers. A -story gambrel roofed addition was built in 1939. It features a covered porch supported by paired Doric order pillars.  It was the home of Harry Fitzhugh Lee, a prominent Goldsboro businessman and a great-nephew of General Robert E. Lee.

It was designed by local architect John David Gullett.

The building was listed on the U.S. National Register of Historic Places in 1984.

References

Lee family residences
Goldsboro, North Carolina
Houses on the National Register of Historic Places in North Carolina
Colonial Revival architecture in North Carolina
Houses completed in 1922
Houses in Wayne County, North Carolina
National Register of Historic Places in Wayne County, North Carolina